Craig Lauzon is a Canadian actor, writer, comedian, and member of the Royal Canadian Air Farce. His main caricatures on the Farce include George Stroumboulopoulos, John Baird, Justin Trudeau and Stephen Harper.

Born in Ottawa, Ontario, Lauzon is of English and Ojibwa descent.

He was formerly an artistic associate at Native Earth Performing Arts, Canada's oldest First Nations performing arts company. In 2011, he starred alongside Lorne Cardinal in a production of Kenneth T. Williams' Thunderstick, in which the two traded roles on alternate days. In 2012, he performed the role of Kent in an all-Aboriginal production of William Shakespeare's King Lear at the National Arts Centre, with a cast that also included August Schellenberg as Lear, Tantoo Cardinal as Regan, Jani Lauzon in a dual role as Cordelia and the Fool, and Billy Merasty as Gloucester.

His other credits include the films Ham & Cheese, Damaged Goods, Bull and Run Woman Run, the television series Trickster, and appearances on The Seán Cullen Show, The Ron James Show and Fool Canada.

References

External links
 Air Farce profile
 

1971 births
Living people
Canadian male comedians
Canadian television personalities
Royal Canadian Air Farce
Ojibwe people
First Nations male actors
Canadian male film actors
Canadian male television actors
Canadian male voice actors
Canadian male stage actors
Male actors from Ottawa
Canadian sketch comedians
Canadian impressionists (entertainers)
21st-century Canadian comedians
Comedians from Ontario
First Nations comedians